Iveta Luzumová (3 April 1989 born Luzumová ) is a Czech handball player for TJ Sokol Písek and the Czech national team.

She participated at the 2018 European Women's Handball Championship.

Individual awards  
Handball-Bundesliga Top Scorer: 2018, 2019

References

1989 births
Living people
Czech female handball players
Expatriate handball players
Czech expatriate sportspeople in France
Czech expatriate sportspeople in Germany
Sportspeople from Písek